Ryder Hall, also known as the Mountain Manor Hotel and Cloud Hotel, is a historic hotel located at Saluda, Polk County, North Carolina. It was built in 1909, as a girls' dormitory for the Saluda Seminary that operated until 1922. It is a -story, "H"-plan, Colonial Revival style frame building sheathed in weatherboard. It has a gambrel roof with shed-roof dormers and features full-width one-story shed roof porches on the front and rear elevations. It housed a public school until 1927, then was converted to a hotel. It was converted to a single-family dwelling after 1992.

It was added to the National Register of Historic Places in 2005.

References

Hotel buildings on the National Register of Historic Places in North Carolina
Colonial Revival architecture in North Carolina
Hotel buildings completed in 1909
Buildings and structures in Polk County, North Carolina
National Register of Historic Places in Polk County, North Carolina